The Dragon is a two-stage French solid propellant sounding rocket used for high altitude research.

The dragon's first stage was a Stromboli engine (diameter 56 cm) which burned 675 kg of fuel in 16 seconds and so produced a maximum thrust of 88 kN. A Bélier engine was used as the upper stage. It belonged thereby to a family of solid-propellant rockets derived from the Bélier, including the Centaure, the Dauphin and the Éridan. A payload of 30 to 120 kg could be carried on parabolic with apogees between 440 km (270 mi) (Dragon 2B) and 560 km (340 mi)(Dragon III) The Dragon was built in several versions including the Dragon-2B, and Dragon-3, Dragons have been launched from Andøya, Norway; Biscarrosse, France; Dumont d'Urville, Antarctica; Chamical, Argentina; CIEES in Hammaguir, Algeria; Kerguelen Islands; Kourou, French Guiana; Mar Chiquita, Argentina; Salto di Quirra, Sardinia; Sonmiani, Pakistan; Thumba, India; and Vík í Mýrdal, Iceland.

References

Sounding rockets of France